Quarto is a board game for two players invented by Swiss mathematician Blaise Müller. It is published and copyrighted by Gigamic.

The game is played on a 4×4 board. There are 16 unique pieces to play with, each of which is either:
 tall or short;
 red or blue (or a different pair of colors, e.g. light- or dark-stained wood);
 square or circular; and
 hollow-top or solid-top.

Players take turns choosing a piece which the other player must then place on the board. A player wins by placing a piece on the board which forms a horizontal, vertical, or diagonal row of four pieces, all of which have a common attribute (all short, all circular, etc.). A variant rule included in many editions gives a second way to win by placing four matching pieces in a 2×2 square.

Quarto is distinctive in that there is only one set of common pieces, rather than a set for one player and a different set for the other. It is therefore an impartial game.

Awards
 Dé d’Or des Créateurs de Jeux 1989 – Paris, France
 Oscar du Jouet – Toy Oscar 1992 – Paris, France
 Jouet de l'année – Game of the Year 1992 – Brussels
 Super As d'Or Festival International des Jeux – Super Golden Ace 1992 – Cannes, France
 Toy Award 1992 – Benelux
 Spiel des Jahres – Game of the Year 1993 nominee – Germany
 Gioco Dell'anno – Game of the Year 1993 – Italy
 Speelgoed Vant Jaar – Game of the year 1993 – Netherlands
 Mensa Select Top 5 Best Games 1993 – US
 Parent's Choice Gold Award 1993 – US
 Best Bet of the Canadian Toy Testing Council 1994 – Canada
 Prix d'Excellence des Consommateurs – Consumer's Toy Award 1994 – Quebec, Canada
 Games Magazine "Games 100 Selection" 1995 – US
 Games Magazine "Games 100 Selection" 1996 – US
 Games Magazine "Games 100 Selection" 1997 – US
 Game of the Year 2004 – Finland
 Parent's Choice Top 25 games in 25 years 2004 – US

References

External links

Quarto (multi-player) at Lifeishao.com

 414298141056 Quarto Draws Suffice! at MathPages
 Program for calculating optimal moves at SourceForge 
 Official website :

Board games introduced in 1991
Abstract strategy games
Mensa Select winners
Solved games